Dragon Ball Z: The Legacy of Goku is a series of video games for the Game Boy Advance, based on the anime series Dragon Ball Z. All three games are action role-playing games. The first game, Dragon Ball Z: The Legacy of Goku, was developed by Webfoot Technologies and released in 2002. The game was followed by two sequels: Dragon Ball Z: The Legacy of Goku II, released in 2003, and Dragon Ball Z: Buu's Fury, released in 2004. In 2016, Webfoot Technologies claimed to be starting development of another sequel.

Gameplay 

The games are action-adventure RPGs. The player controls a Dragon Ball character and experiences various portions of the franchise. Combat is the main focus of the game. The player can press the 'A' button to use physical strikes, while the 'B' button allows the player to unleash a variety of energy-based attacks. Energy attacks drain an energy gauge - though it gradually recharges when not in use. Energy attacks can be cycled through with the 'L' button, and more energy attacks are learned as the player progresses through the game. Legacy of Goku II and Buu's Fury featured transformations that made the player character temporarily stronger, using their own 'rage mode' mechanic. By defeating enemies, the player receives experience points, which allow the player character to level up and grow stronger. Legacy of Goku II and Buu's Fury also feature consumable items that would restore the player character's health or energy, as well as equipment that increases the player character's stats. Legacy of Goku II and Buu's Fury also allow the player to use a device called a scouter, which is used to look up the stats of the various characters and enemies in the games, as well as basic information about them.

Plot

The Legacy of Goku 
The game covers the story of Dragon Ball Z up until the destruction of the planet Namek, where Goku is the only playable character. Goku travels through different stages, including several locations of the earth and planet Namek, and gains experience not only by defeating enemies, but also by completing simple missions. In the final stage, Goku transforms into a Super Saiyan in order to defeat Frieza, this being the first introduction to character transformations in the series, which will later be very common in the following games. It is also one of the first GBA games to feature full-motion video, predating the Game Boy Advance Video.

The Legacy of Goku II 
Dragon Ball Z: The Legacy of Goku II was released in North America by Infogrames on 17 June 2003. The plot of the game picks up where The Legacy of Goku left off, and continues until the end of the Cell Games Saga, when Gohan defeats the evil android Cell (between episodes 118 and 194).

The game introduced several new concepts to the series. The first was transformations, which allowed characters to become temporarily stronger, at the cost of slowly draining their energy bar. It also introduced the scouter, which allowed players to look up the stats of other characters in the game, as well as basic information about them. The game also introduced charged melee attacks, which allowed characters to unleash a powerful physical strike after a short charging period. The game also allowed characters to further supplement their stats with capsules that were scattered around the game world.

Despite being titled "The Legacy of Goku", this game featured the most limited play as Goku, with players starting play as Gohan and gradually unlocking Piccolo, Vegeta, Trunks, and finally, Goku, as playable characters. Once the story is completed, players can no longer play as Goku, but will be able to continue playing as the others to unlock a final playable character, Mister Satan/Hercule, in order to unlock an alternate ending to the game. The game's music is based on Bruce Faulconer's score for the FUNimation English dub of Dragon Ball Z.

Due to the game's success, a second version was released titled Dragon Ball Z: The Legacy of Goku II International, exclusive to Japan on 23 July 2004. In this version, all characters were given new profile images and their names were reverted to their original Japanese ones. However, Mister Satan still retains his English name "Hercule" on the front of his parade float.

Buu's Fury 
Dragon Ball Z: Buu's Fury is the third and final game in the series. It was released on 14 September 2004 in North America. The game focuses on the final parts of the Dragon Ball Z series (season 7), namely the battles with Majin Buu; the first chapter takes place during episode 195 to episode 199, whilst the rest of the game takes place during episode 200 (after a seven-year flash-forward) and the following episodes.

The game added several new additions to the series. First, the game added equipment, which could be equipped to characters to alter their stats and provide various other benefits. The game also allowed players to allocate their own stat points, of which three were given per level. Also added was the ability to block by holding the 'R' button, and also to energy block by holding the 'B' button while blocking. Using the energy block slowly drains the user's energy gauge. Both techniques greatly decrease the amount of damage that is received from attacks.

The game also added various other features, such as fusions and the ability to transform into a Super Saiyan 3. Although many features were added, the ability to use charge attacks by holding and releasing the 'A' button was eliminated. Players are able to play as Goku, Gohan, Goten, Vegeta and Kid Trunks in the game, with players able to unlock fusions with Gotenks and Gogeta. Like Dragon Ball Z: The Legacy of Goku II, the game's music is also based on Bruce Faulconer's score for the FUNimation English dub of Dragon Ball Z.

The dialogues used in the English edition of the game are very similar, and sometimes identical, to the ones used in the English dubbed animated series (similar to Dragon Ball Z: The Legacy of Goku II).

Characters 
The Legacy of Goku games feature a variety of characters from the Dragon Ball universe for the player to play as. In the first game, only Goku was playable. However, in subsequent games in the series, multiple characters were playable, including: Gohan, Goten, Trunks (kid and future), Piccolo, Vegeta, and Hercule. In Buu's Fury, a Fusion concept was implemented that allows certain characters to combine with each other, boosting their stats and changing their appearance. The three available fusion characters in the game are: Gotenks, Gogeta, and a one-time playable Vegito. All three games feature non-canon characters and events from filler arcs, The History of Trunks, Broly - Second Coming and Dragon Ball Z: Fusion Reborn.

Reception

The Legacy of Goku 

The Legacy of Goku received "mixed" reviews according to the review aggregation website Metacritic. In the United States, the game sold 630,000 copies and earned $16 million by August 2006. During the period between May 2002 and August 2006, it was the 42nd highest-selling game launched for the Game Boy Advance, in that country.

The Legacy of Goku II 

The Legacy of Goku II received "generally favorable reviews" according to Metacritic.

Buu's Fury 

Buu's Fury received "mixed" reviews according to Metacritic.

See also

 List of Japanese role-playing game franchises

References

External links 
 
 
 

Game Boy Advance games
Game Boy Advance-only games
Legacy of Goku
Action role-playing video games by series
Video games developed in the United States
Video games scored by Yannis Brown
Webfoot Technologies games
Infogrames games
Atari games